Ray Edison Porter (July 29, 1891 – August 10, 1963) was a U.S. Army Major General. In World War II he served on the Africa campaign, in the War Department, and then led the 75th Infantry Division. Dwight D. Eisenhower named him as one of fifty who took over the  Army Service Forces' Project Planning Division, the Special Planning Division or SPD.

Biography
Major General Ray E. Porter, U.S. Army, Retired was born at Fordyce, Arkansas on 29 July 1891, the son of William and Hattie E. Porter. He received his education at Fordyce High School and at the University of Arkansas. On 21 May 1921, he was married to Maude Garner, daughter of John W. Garner and Mrs Effie Garner of Fordyce. He had three children: Colonel Ray E. Porter, Jr, Mrs. Peggy Northington, and Mrs Patricia Burke.  General Porter, his son, Colonel Ray E. Porter jr, and grandson, Colonel Ray E. Porter III are the first third generation graduates of the US Army War College at Carlisle Barracks, PA. (1937, 1961, & 1988)

Porter entered the military service with the First Officers' Training Camp, Fort Logan H. Roots, Arkansas, 15 May 1917, receiving his first Army commission in the Officers' Reserve Corps 15 August of the same year. He was appointed a Second Lieutenant of Infantry in the Regular Army on 26 October 1917 and progressed through the successive grades of the Regular Army to his appointment as a Major General, 21 September 1943.

During World War I, Porter participated in combat in the European Theater of Operations with Company E, 34th Infantry Regiment, 7th Infantry Division. He was awarded the American Distinguished Service Cross and the French Croix de Guerre for gallantry in action 1–2 November 1918. The citation for his DSC reads:

Between the World Wars Porter graduated from the Company Officers Course (1928) and the Advanced Course (1932) of the Infantry School, Fort Benning, Georgia; The Command and General Staff School (1935), Fort Leavenworth, Kansas and the Army War College (1937), Washington, D.C. Other service of that period included duty as Professor of Military Science and Tactics, Ouachita Baptist College, Arkadelphia, Arkansas; (1922–1927) a tour of foreign service with the 19th Infantry in Hawaii, (1928–1931) and instructor at the Command and General Staff School, Fort Leavenworth, Kansas, 1937-1940.

In World War II he took part in the assault landing of the Allied Forces at Algiers, North Africa in November 1942 and served as Deputy Chief of Staff at General Eisenhower's Advance Headquarters during the Tunisian campaign. Returning to the United States after the German surrender in North Africa, he was assigned as Assistant Chief of Staff, G-3 (Organization and Training), War Department General Staff. For his services he was awarded the Army Distinguished Service Medal, with the medal's citation reading:

When the Germans attacked in the Battle of the Bulge during December 1944, Porter was flown immediately to the European Theater of Operations where he assumed command of the 75th Infantry Division in combat until the end of hostilities in that theater. He briefly commanded the Fifteenth United States Army from 8 to 16 January 1945. Shortly after Victory in Europe Day he was again called home for duty as Chief of the Special Planning Division, War Department Special Staff.

From 1948 to 1951, Porter commanded the United States Army in the Caribbean with his headquarters at Fort Amador, Canal Zone. His command included the United States Army forces and activities in Panama and Puerto Rico and the United States Army Missions in the numerous republics of Central and South America.

He was retired from Camp Breckinridge, Kentucky, where he had commanded the Replacement Training Center and the 101st Airborne Division, 30 June 1953.

Awards and decorations
Porter's decorations and medals include:

 United States
  Distinguished Service Cross
  Distinguished Service Medal
  Legion of Merit
  Bronze Star Medal
  Army Commendation Medal
  Purple Heart
 Eight Campaign Medals

 Foreign
  Officer of the Legion of Honor (France)
  Grand Officer of the Order of Orange-Nassau (Netherlands)
  Honorary Commander of the Order of the British Empire (Great Britain)
  Grand Officer of the Order of Boyaca (Republic of Colombia)
  Grand Officer of the Order of Vasco Núñez de Balboa (Republic of Panama)
  Cavalier of the Legion of Honor (France)
  Order of Abdon Calderón, First Class (Ecuador)
 Medal of Military Merit, First Class (Republic of Chile)
 Croix de Guerre with Palm and Gold Star (France)
  Croix de Guerre with Palm (Belgium)
 Order of Eloy Alfaro (Foundation of International Eloy Alfaro)

Promotions
 Second Lieutenant, Officers Reserve Corps - 15 August 1917
 Second Lieutenant Infantry, Regular Army - 26 October 1917
 First Lieutenant - 26 October 1917
 Captain (temporary) - 6 May 1919
 Captain, Regular Army - 1 July 1920
 Major, Regular Army- 1 August 1935
 Lieutenant Colonel, Regular Army - 18 August 1938
 Colonel (temporary) - 24 December 1941
 Brigadier General (temporary) - 1 August 1942
 Major General(temporary) - 21 September 1943
 Major General, Regular Army - 1948 with rank from 8 October 1944

See also

References

Lonesentry
Generals of World War II

|-

1891 births
1963 deaths
Military personnel from Arkansas
United States Army personnel of World War I
United States Army generals of World War II
United States Army generals
Honorary Commanders of the Order of the British Empire
Grand Officers of the Order of Orange-Nassau
Officiers of the Légion d'honneur
Recipients of the Croix de guerre (Belgium)
Recipients of the Croix de Guerre 1914–1918 (France)
Recipients of the Distinguished Service Cross (United States)
Recipients of the Distinguished Service Medal (US Army)
United States Army Infantry Branch personnel
Recipients of the Legion of Merit
People from Fordyce, Arkansas
United States Army War College alumni
United States Army Command and General Staff College alumni